Graphoceras is an extinct ammonite genus included in the hildoceratacean family Graphoceratidae that lived during the  Aalenian and Bajocian stages, Middle Jurassic in what is now Europe, north Africa, and Iran.

Graphoceras produced a compressed, involute shell with a raised umbilical edge and sinuous ribbing.

References

 Arkell et al., 1957. Mesozoic Ammonoidea (L264), Treatise on Invertebrate Paleontology Part L. Geological Society of America and University of Kansas Press.

Middle Jurassic ammonites
Ammonites of Europe
Hildoceratoidea
Ammonitida genera